The 2008–09 Icelandic Hockey League season was the 18th season of the Icelandic Hockey League, the top level of ice hockey in Iceland. Three teams participated in the league, and Skautafelag Reykjavikur won the championship.

Regular season

Final
 Skautafélag Akureyrar - Skautafélag Reykjavíkur 1:3 (5:6, 4:5, 5:4 n.V., 3:7)

External links 
 2008-09 season.info

Icelandic Hockey League
Icelandic Hockey League seasons
2008–09 in Icelandic ice hockey